Teeth blackening or teeth lacquering is a custom of dyeing one's teeth black. It was most predominantly practiced in Southeast Asian and Oceanic cultures, particularly among Austronesian, Austroasiatic, and Kra–Dai-speaking peoples. It was also practiced in Japan prior to the Meiji era, as well as in India. It was also performed among some groups in the Americas, most notably among the Shuar people of northern Peru and Ecuador.

Teeth blackening is usually done during puberty. It was primarily done to preserve the teeth into old age, as it prevents tooth decay similar to the mechanism of modern dental sealants. It was seen as a sign of maturity, beauty, and civilization. A common belief is that blackened teeth differentiated humans from animals. Teeth blackening is often done in conjunction with traditions of tooth sharpening and dental evulsion, as well as other body modification customs like tattoos. Teeth blackening and filing were regarded with fascination and disapproval by early European explorers and colonists. 

The practice survives in some isolated ethnic groups in Southeast Asia and Oceania but has mostly disappeared after the introduction of Western beauty standards during the colonial era, and continues among many minority groups in China, Pacific Islands and Southeast Asia. It is mainly prevalent in older women, though the practice is still carried on by some younger women. Sometimes artificial teeth are used to achieve blackened teeth.

Teeth blackening is commonly confused with the red-stained teeth from betel chewing. However, betel chewing damages the teeth and gums, while teeth blackening does not.

East and Southeast Asia

Japan

Objects that were pitch black, such as glaze-like lacquer, were seen as beautiful.

Name
The word  was an aristocratic term. At the old Imperial palace in Kyoto, it was called .

History
In particular, the Imperial family and other high-ranking aristocrats who had finished their  (ceremony where a child is fitted with a ) blackened their teeth and painted their eyebrows. This was done in the Imperial household until the end of the Edo era.

In the Muromachi period (1336–1573),  was generally seen among adults, though when the Sengoku period (1467–1615) began, so as to prepare for political marriages of convenience, when the daughters of military commanders were around 8 to 10 years old, they would blacken their teeth as a marking of their coming of age. Relatives and guardians of the bride who blackened their teeth were called . It is said that military commanders who were struck in the head on the battlefield and who did not want to be ugly would wear average women's makeup and would blacken their teeth. These faces imitated the Noh masks of women and young boys.

After the Edo period (1603–1867), only men of the Imperial House of Japan and the aristocracy blackened their teeth. Due to the odor and labor required for the process, as well as a feeling among young women that they were ageing,  was done only by married women, unmarried women who were older than 18, sex workers and geisha. For rural people,  was done only at times of special celebrations, such as Japanese festivals, wedding ceremonies, and funerals.

On February 5, 1870, the government banned  and the process gradually became obsolete. After the Meiji period, it temporarily spread, but it almost entirely died out in the Taishō period (1912–1926).

In contemporary times, the only places where  can be seen is in plays, on some older apprentice geisha, some festivals, and movies.

Vietnam

In Vietnam, tooth painting was practiced by the majority Vietnamese people as well as by minority ethnic groups. Si La men paint their teeth red and the women paint theirs black. This practice has slowly declined with each new generation. The Baiyue in southern China and northern Vietnam also practiced teeth blackening. When Han Chinese ruled the Vietnamese in the Fourth Chinese domination of Vietnam due to the Ming dynasty's conquest during the Ming–Hồ War, they imposed the Han Chinese style of men wearing long hair on short haired Vietnamese men. The Vietnamese people were ordered to stop cutting and instead grow their hair long and switch to Han Chinese clothing in only a month by a Ming official. Ming administrators said their mission was to "civilize" the unorthodox, by Han Chinese standards, appearance of the Vietnamese. 

The Ming dynasty only wanted the Vietnamese to wear long hair and to stop teeth blackening so they could have white teeth and long hair like Chinese. A royal edict was issued by Vietnam in 1474 forbidding Vietnamese from adopting foreign languages, hairstyles and clothes like that of the Lao, Champa or the "Northerners" which referred to the Ming. The edict was recorded in the 1479 Complete Chronicle of Dai Viet of Ngô Sĩ Liên.

The Philippines
In the Philippines, Spanish colonial official and historian, Antonio de Morga, recorded in his book,  (1609), on how local men and women of the Philippines cared and presented themselves at the time. It was noted by Morga:

The late 19th century Filipino nationalist, writer, and polymath, José Rizal, commented in his annotations to Morga's account that: "This custom still exists... This custom exists also among the married women of Japan, as a Sign of their chastity. It is now falling into disuse."

Thailand
Teeth blackening was practiced in Thailand since the very early kingdoms of Sukhothai, Lanna and Ayutthaya through betel chewing. The dark red black stain left on the teeth was considered a sign of beauty, and betel nut chewing was an activity performed during courtship.

Other areas
Teeth blackening has been documented throughout a number of other peoples in the Far East:

 Yunnan, China
 Blang people
 Dai
 Hmoob
 Jino
 Gin (Vietnamese Kinh)
 Lahu
 Yao
 Laos
 Hani
 Katu
 Phunoi
 Philippines
 Luzon
 Mindanao
 Pacific Islands
 Palau
 Yap
 Mariana Islands
 Thailand
 Akha
 Lisu
 Vietnam
 Kinh
 Yao
 Lu
 Hmong people
 Nùng
 Si La

South Asia
Teeth blackening was also documented across Islamic culture in South Asia:

Africa
Further West, teeth blackening has been documented as far as Madagascar.

References

External links

 tools 

Cultural history of Japan
Japanese fashion
Chinese traditions
Vietnamese traditions
Dental modification